The 1980 NCAA Rifle Championship was the first annual tournament to determine the national champion of co-ed NCAA collegiate rifle shooting. The championship was held at the ETSU Athletic Center at East Tennessee State University in Johnson City, Tennessee during March 1980. Prior to 1980, a collegiate rifle championship was held yearly by the National Rifle Association.

Tennessee Tech, with a team score of 6,201, claimed their first national title. West Virginia finished in second with 6,150. The Golden Eagles were coached by James Newkirk.

Rod Fitz-Randolph, from Tennessee Tech, claimed the individual titles for both smallbore and air rifle.

Qualification
Since there is only one national collegiate championship for rifle shooting, all NCAA rifle programs (whether from Division I, Division II, or Division III) were eligible. A total of 10 teams ultimately contested this championship.

Results
Scoring:  The championship consisted of 120 shots by each competitor in smallbore and 40 shots per competitor in air rifle.

Team title

Individual events

References

NCAA Rifle Championship
NCAA Rifle Championships
1980 in shooting sports